Tyler Rich (born February 24, 1986) is an American country music singer. He was born Tyler Weinrich in Yuba City, California and began listening to country music at age eight. Rich began learning to play guitar at age 14 and, after graduating college, moved to Los Angeles, California. He self-released the single "Radio" in 2014. He also self-released a four-song extended play. After moving to Nashville, Tennessee, he was signed by Big Machine Records imprint Valory Music Group. The label issued his single "The Difference" in 2018. "The Difference" has charted on Hot Country Songs and Country Airplay and was certified Platinum by Music Canada and Gold in the U.S. by RIAA. The song, written by Rhett Akins, Devin Dawson, Benjamin Burgess, and Jacob Durrett, was inspired by Rich's wife (then fiancée), Sabina Rich (Gadeki). Rich began touring with Brett Young in late 2018. Rich's debut album "Two Thousand Miles" was released on September 4, 2020.

Discography

Albums

Extended plays

Singles

Music videos

Certifications and Sales

References

1986 births
American country singer-songwriters
American male singer-songwriters
Big Machine Records artists
Country musicians from California
People from Yuba City, California
Living people
21st-century American singers
21st-century American male singers
Singer-songwriters from California